George Baddeley (8 May 1874 – July 1952) was an English footballer who played in the Football League for Stoke and West Bromwich Albion.

Career
Born in Fegg Hayes, Stoke-upon-Trent, Baddeley attended Fegg Hayes Church of England School. After leaving school he played football for Ball Heath, Burslem Swifts, Pitshill and Biddulph He joined Stoke in May 1900 he made his debut in 1901–02. He was awarded the captaincy in his first full season of 1902–03, alongside Tom Holford and James Bradley, Baddeley completed a powerful midfield three which effectively kept Stoke in the First Division throughout the early 1900s. Although occasionally criticised for 'marring a clever display by trying to do much with the ball' Baddeley's consistency allowed him to play 99 consecutive for Stoke from February 1903. Despite home crowds averaging 8,000 in 1905–06, the directors brought poorly and Stoke imploded first being relegated and then being liquidated which saw them leave the Football League at the end of the 1907–08 season.

In July 1908 Baddeley along with centre forward Freddie Brown signed for West Bromwich Albion for £250 and made his debut away at Grimsby Town two months later. He won a Second Division championship medal with the club in 1910–11 and an FA Cup runners-up medal in 1912. Baddeley's last game for Albion was against Sheffield Wednesday on 18 April 1914, at the age of 39 years, 345 days. He remains, as of October 2008, the oldest player ever to appear for the club in a competitive fixture. He retired from football the following month after playing making 157 senior appearances for West Bromwich Albion. He subsequently became a publican and also worked in the upholstery trade. He died in West Bromwich in July 1952.

Career statistics
Source:

Honours
 West Bromwich Albion
 Football League Second Division champions: 1910–11
 FA Cup runner-up: 1911–12

References

1874 births
1952 deaths
Footballers from Stoke-on-Trent
English footballers
Stoke City F.C. players
West Bromwich Albion F.C. players
English Football League players
Association football defenders
FA Cup Final players